The Kid from Kokomo is a 1939 American comedy film directed by Lewis Seiler and written by Richard Macaulay and Jerry Wald. The film stars Pat O'Brien, Wayne Morris, Joan Blondell, May Robson, Jane Wyman and Stanley Fields. The film was released by Warner Bros. on May 23, 1939.

Plot
In need of a new prizefighter, manager Billy Murphy and his sweetheart Doris Harvey come across one in Kokomo, Indiana, a kid called Homer Baston who's got great potential. The kid's a little dim, however, explaining how he can't leave Kokomo because his mother abandoned him as a baby but promised to come back.

Billy and Doris convince him to go on the road, where Homer will have a better chance of finding his long-missing mother. Homer gets homesick, so Billy pays the bail of a thief, Maggie Manell, hiring her to pretend to be Homer's ma. She begins spending most of Homer's money, and Billy's scheme to bring in her pal Muscles Malone backfires when Homer's led to believe Muscles is his dad.

While falling for Marian Bronson, a reporter, Homer trains for a title fight against Curley Bender, but is convinced by "Ma" to lose on purpose because she owes money to gamblers. In the ring, Curley insults his mother, so Homer knocks him out. Billy and Doris look on as a double wedding is held, Homer marrying Marian while a reluctant Maggie and Muscles do likewise, becoming his new foster parents.

Cast          
Pat O'Brien as William Jennings 'Billy / 'Square Shooting Murph' Murphy
Wayne Morris as Homer Baston
Joan Blondell as Doris Harvey
May Robson as Margaret 'Maggie' / 'Ma' Manell
Jane Wyman as Marian Bronson
Stanley Fields as Muscles Malone
Maxie Rosenbloom as Curley Bender 
Sidney Toler as Judge William 'Gashouse' Bronson
Edward Brophy as Eddie Black 
Winifred Harris as Mrs. Bronson
Morgan Conway as Louie
John Ridgely as Sam
Ward Bond as Ladislaw Klewicki
Paul Hurst as First Old Man in Fistfight

References

External links 
 
 

1939 films
Warner Bros. films
American martial arts comedy films
1939 comedy films
Films directed by Lewis Seiler
Films scored by Adolph Deutsch
American black-and-white films
American boxing films
American comedy road movies
1930s English-language films
1930s American films